4-Methylsalicylic acid is an organic compound with the formula CH3C6H3(CO2H)(OH). It is a white solid that is soluble in basic water and in polar organic solvents.  Its functional groups include a carboxylic acid and a phenol group.  It is one of four isomers of methylsalicylic acid, including the naturally occurring 6-methylsalicylic acid.  The compound has few applications.  It can be prepared by hydroxylation of 4-methylbenzoic acid.

See also
 3-Methylsalicylic acid
 6-Methylsalicylic acid

References 

Salicylic acids